"Go Get It" is a song by American hip hop recording artist T.I., released July 17, 2012, as the first single from his eighth studio album Trouble Man: Heavy Is the Head (2012). The song was produced by Canadian hip hop and R&B producer T-Minus, who T.I. previously collaborated with on "Poppin Bottles", featuring Drake, from his seventh studio album No Mercy (2010). Before its official release, the song had leaked online earlier in June. This song is featured on EA Sports UFC 2.

Music video
Before the video's release, the rapper uploaded a teaser video, followed by a behind-the-scenes video. The music video, directed by Alex Nazari, was released on August 16, 2012 via his YouTube account. As of February  2023, the video has 90 million views.

Track listing
Digital download
 "Go Get It" — 3:37

Credits and personnel
 Songwriter – C. Harris, Nikhil Seetharam, T. Williams
 Production – T-Minus

Charts

Radio and release history

References

External links
 

2012 singles
T.I. songs
Grand Hustle Records singles
Songs written by T.I.
Song recordings produced by T-Minus (record producer)
Atlantic Records singles
Songs written by Nikhil Seetharam
Songs written by T-Minus (record producer)
2012 songs